Prasanth Mambully is an Indian film director, screen writer and actor from Guruvayur, Kerala. He started his movie career by acting in Malayalam films, and later in 2008, made his directorial debut with  Bhagavan. Bhagavan was completed in 19 hours, which was a world record at that time in Malayalam film industry.

Biography

Prasanth was born in Guruvayur, Thrissur, Kerala, India. He began his movie career with stage shows, television programs and small roles in movies.

In 2008 Prasanth made his debut in directing. Bhagavan was Prasanth's first movie with Malayalam super star Mohanlal in lead role. The movie was completed within a time span of 19 hours which was a world record. While his second movie was in Kannada, the movie Sugreeva with Kannada superstar Shivarajkumar in lead. Prasanth broke his own record and completed the movie Sugreeva with in 18 hours, for this achievement he was included Limca Book of Records as the fastest film maker of Indian film industry.

In 2012 he marked his debut in Tamil with the film unka veettu pillai. His next movie Pachakallam was released in 2016 with Maqbool Salmaan nephew of actor megastar Mammooty in lead role along with actors Abbas and Thiagarajan. In 2017 movie Sadrishavakyam 24:29 was released under prasanth's direction, where Manoj K. Jayan and Sheelu Abraham have done the lead roles.

In 2018 he announced his Hindi-language debut, Sreedevi Bungalow. The movie is titled as Sridevi Bungalow starring Priya Prakash Varrier in lead role with a budget of 70 crores the movie is planned to be shot in London.

Filmography

Awards and Accolades
 Limca Book of Records
 National Record 2011 for fastest film maker in India.

References

External links
 
 

21st-century Indian film directors
Living people
Film directors from Thrissur
Malayalam film directors
Malayalam screenwriters
People from Thrissur
Writers from Thrissur
Screenwriters from Kerala
Year of birth missing (living people)